Reece is a given name and surname that derives from the Welsh name Rhys. Notable people with the name include:

Surname
Alan Reece (1927–2012), English engineer and entrepreneur
Alex Reece, British musician
Alicia Reece (born 1971), American politician
Andy Reece (born 1962), English footballer
Angel Katherine Reece, better known as Hailey Hatred (born 1983), American professional wrestler
B. Carroll Reece (1889–1961), American politician
Barbara Massey Reece (born 1942), American politician
Beasley Reece (born 1954), American football player
Bessie Reece
Bob Reece (born 1951), American  baseball player
Brian Reece (1913–1962), English actor
Byron Herbert Reece (1917–1958), American author
Caley Reece (born 1979), Australian kickboxer
Carlton Reece (1915–1963), Guyanese cricketer
Carmen Reece, British singer, songwriter, musician and producer
Charlie Reece (born 1989), English footballer
Christopher Reece (born 1959), American musician
Cleo Reece, activist and filmmaker
Courtenay Reece (1899–1984), Barbadian first-class cricketer and cricket umpire
Damon Reece (born 1967), English drummer
Danny Reece (born 1955), American football player
Dave Reece (born 1948), American ice hockeyplayer
David Reece, American singer
Dizzy Reece (born 1931), Jamaican-born hard bop jazz trumpeter
Don Reece (1919–1992), American football player
Donald James Reece (born 1934), Emeritus Archbishop of the Roman Catholic Archdiocese of Kingston in Jamaica
E Reece, American rapper-songwriter, actor, and model
Eric Reece (1909–1999), Premier of Tasmania
Erik Reece, American writer
Eryn Reece, American bartender
Florence Reece (1900–1986), American social activist, poet, and folksong writer
Gabrielle Reece (born 1970), American volleyball player and fashion model
Geoff Reece (born 1952), American football player
Gerald Reece (1897–1985), British writer and colonial administrator
Gil Reece (1942–2003), Welsh international footballer
Gordon Reece (1929–2001), British journalist and television producer
Jack Reece (1927–1966), New Zealand cricketer
James Reece (disambiguation)
Jane Reece (born 1944), American geneticist
Jason Reece (born 1971), American drummer and vocalist
Jimmy Reece (1929–1958), American racecar driver
John Reece (born 1957), British businessman
Kensley Reece (born 1945), former Barbadian cyclist
Lewis Reece (born 1991), Welsh rugby league footballer
Louise Goff Reece (1898–1970), American politician
Luis Reece (born 1990), English cricketer
Marcel Reece (born 1985), American football player
Marilyn Jorgenson Reece (1926–2004), American civil engineer
Maynard Reece (1920–2020), American artist
Nicholas Reece (born 1974), Australian politician and policy activist
Paul Reece (born 1968), English footballer
Richard Reece (born 1939), numismatist and academic
Sevu Reece (born 1997), Fiji-born, New Zealand rugby union player
Shakera Reece (born 1988), Barbadian sprinter
Skeena Reece (born 1974), Canadian First Nations artist
Spencer Reece, poet and presbyter
Stephanie Reece (born 1970), American tennis player
Travis Reece (born 1975), American football player
William Reece (1856–1930), mayor of Christchurch, New Zealand
William Lewis Reece (born 1959), American serial killer

Given name
Reece Beckles-Richards (born 1995), Antigua and Barbudan international footballer
Reece Beekman (born 2001), American college basketball player
Reece Bellotti (born 1990), English boxer
Reece Blayney (born 1985), Australian rugby league footballer
Reece Boughton (born 1995), English rugby union player
Reece Brown (footballer, born 1991), English footballer
Reece Brown (footballer, born 1996), English footballer
Reece Burke (born 1996), English footballer
Reece Caira (born 1993), Australian footballer
Reece Caudle (1888–1955), American politician
Reece Chapman-Smith (born 1998), English rugby league footballer
Reece Cole (born 1998), English footballer
Reece Conca (born 1992), Australian rules footballer
Reece Connolly (born 1992), English footballer
Reece Crowther (born 1988), Australian footballer
Reece Deakin (born 1996), Welsh footballer
Reece Dinsdale (born 1959), English actor and director
Reece Donaldson (born 1994), Scottish footballer
Reece Douglas (born 1994), English actor
Reece Fielding (born 1998), English footballer
Reece Flanagan (born 1994), English footballer
Reece Gaines (born 1981), American basketball player and coach
Reece Gaskell (born 2000s), English footballer
Reece Gray (born 1992), English footballer
Reece Grego-Cox (born 1996), English footballer
Reece Hales (born 1995), English footballer
Reece Hall-Johnson (born 1995), English footballer
Reece Hands (born 1993), English footballer
Reece Hewat (born 1995), South African-born Australian rugby union player
Reece Hodge (born 1994), Australian rugby union player
Reece Hoffman (born 2001), Australian rugby league footballer
Reece Humphrey (born 1986), American freestyle wrestler
Reece Hussain (born 1995), English cricketer
Reece Hutchinson (born 2000), English footballer
Reece James (disambiguation)
Reece James (footballer, born 1993), English footballer
Reece James (footballer, born 1999), English footballer
Reece Jones (disambiguation), several people
Reece Jones (artist) (born 1976), British artist
Reece Jones (footballer) (born 1992), Welsh international footballer
Reece Jones (geographer) (born 1976), American political geographer
Reece Kelly, Irish cricketer
Reece Kershaw, Commissioner of the Australian Federal Police
Reece Lyne (born 1992), English rugby league footballer
Reece Lyon (born 2000), Scottish footballer
Reece Marshall (born 1994), rugby union player
Reece Mastin, Australian singer; see Reece Mastin
Reece McAlear (born 2002), Scottish footballer
Reece McFadden (born 1995), Scottish boxer
Reece McGinley (born 2000), Northern Irish footballer
Reece Mitchell (born 1995), English footballer
Reece Morrison (born 1945), American football player
Reece Noi (born 1988), British actor and writer
Reece Oxford (born 1998), English footballer
Reece Papuni (born 1987), light heavyweight boxer
Reece Prescod (born 1996), British sprinter
Reece Ritchie (born 1986), English actor
Reece Robinson (born 1987), Lebanon international rugby league footballer
Reece Robinson (darts player) (born 1992), English darts player
Reece Robson (born 1998), Australian rugby league footballer
Reece Scarlett (born 1993), Canadian ice hockey player
Reece Shearsmith (born 1969), British comedian
Reece Shipley (1921–1998), American country musician
Reece Simmonds (born 1980), Australian rugby league footballer
Reece Styche (born 1989), English footballer
Reece Joseph Staunton (born 2001), footballer
Reece Thompson (born 1988), Canadian actor
Reece Thompson (footballer) (born 1993), English footballer
Reece Tollenaere (born 1977), Australian footballer
Reece Topley (born 1994), English international cricketer)
Reece Ushijima (born 2003), Japanese-American racing driver
Reece Wabara (born 1991), English businessman and footballer
Reece Waldock, Australian public servant
Reece Webb-Foster (born 1998), English footballer
Reece Whitby (born 1964), Australian politician
Reece Whitley (born 2000), American competitive swimmer
Reece Willcox (born 1994), Canadian ice hockey player
Reece Williams (born 1985), Australian rugby league footballer and referee
Reece Williams (cricketer) (born 1988), South African cricketer
Reece Willison (born 1999), Scottish footballer
Reece Wilson (born 1996), Scottish downhill mountain biker
Reece Young (born 1979), New Zealand Test cricketer

Other names
 Uncle Reece, stage name of Maurice Hicks Jr. (born 1984), American musician

See also
 Rees (surname)
 Reese (given name)

References